NA-127 Lahore-XI is a constituency for the National Assembly of Pakistan. NA-127 covers the areas of Liaqatabad, Model Town Ext (Q, R and S blocks), Pindi Rajputan, Ismail Nagar, Kot Lakhpat, Chungi Amar Sadhu, Teharta Pind, Bagrian, Green Town, Township, Maryam Colony, Sitara Colony , Wafaqi Colony and Farid Colony.

Members of Parliament

2021-2022: NA-133 Lahore-XI

Election 2008 

General elections were held on 18 Feb 2008. Chaudhry Naseer Ahmed Bhutta of PML-N won by 53,602 votes.

Election 2013 

General elections were held on 11 May 2013. Waheed Alam Khan of PML-N won by 71,493 votes and became the  member of National Assembly.

Election 2018 

General elections were held on 25 July 2018.

By-election 2021
On 5 December 2021, bye-elections were held in the whole constituency as the seat got vacated after its former member Pervaiz Malik's death. In its result, PML-N's Shaista Pervaiz won the seat by receiving 46,811 votes defeating Pakistan Peoples Party (PPP)'s Aslam Gill who received 32,313 votes.

See also
NA-126 Lahore-X
NA-128 Lahore-XII

References

External links 
 Election result's official website

NA-127
National Assembly Constituencies of Pakistan